Rock in a Hard Place is the seventh studio album by American hard rock band Aerosmith, released on August 27, 1982 by Columbia Records. It was certified gold on November 10, 1989. It is the only Aerosmith album not to feature lead guitarist Joe Perry, following his departure from the band in 1979. Rhythm guitarist Brad Whitford also left during the recording in 1981. The band spent $1.5 million on the recording of this album, which saw them reunited with producer Jack Douglas.

Background
Aerosmith had released six studio albums during the 1970s. But as the decade concluded, multiple problems arose. Guitarist Joe Perry had left the band in 1979 after incidents at the World Series of Rock in Cleveland, Ohio and was replaced by Jimmy Crespo. Meanwhile, Steven Tyler's drug abuse increased. After recording the single "Lightning Strikes", guitarist Brad Whitford also left Aerosmith in 1981 and was replaced by Rick Dufay when the recording of the album was finally complete.

An outtake from the album titled “Riff & Roll” was released on their 1991 box set, Pandora’s Box.

Critical reception 

From contemporary reviews, J. D. Considine lamented in Rolling Stone how the band had decided to maintain their old sound on the album, despite new heavy rock "fast power chords had made Aerosmith’s bluesy boogie almost obsolete". He praised "Perry lookalike Jimmy Crespo"'s guitar playing, but wrote that "despite an occasional burst of primal energy, much of the LP rocks by rote." Ken Tucker of The Philadelphia Inquirer gave the album a one out of five star rating, opining that "It's sad when once-vital hard rock bands outlast their usefulness, if only because there are so few of them around."

AllMusic Greg Prato wrote that Aerosmith "didn't possess the magical chemistry of their '70s classics" without Perry and Whitford, but the band could "still rock out" producing their "most studio-enhanced and experimental record up to this point" with "a few pleasant surprises", like "the psychedelicized 'Joanie's Butterfly'". Canadian journalist Martin Popoff described the album as "a bit patchy" with highlights being "Jailbait", "Lightning Strikes" and "Joanie's Butterfly" and the rest "variously lumbering, untuneful and forced", and concluded that, although Aerosmith "could barely function", they "never made a bad record." "In theory a disaster," observed Classic Rock magazine, "in practice, an unlikely triumph. Never mind the Spinal Tap-anticipating Stonehenge cover – Rock in a Hard Place is one kick-ass album… 'Lightning Strikes', 'Bolivian Ragamuffin' and 'Joanie's Butterfly' are classic Aerosmith songs – no matter who played on them."

"The record doesn't suck," wrote drummer Joey Kramer in his 2009 autobiography, Hit Hard: A Story of Hitting Rock Bottom at the Top. "There's some real good stuff on it. But it's not a real Aerosmith record because it's just me, Steven, and Tom [Hamilton] — with a fill-in guitar player... It's Jimmy Crespo doing the guitar work."

Track listing

Personnel 

Aerosmith
 Steven Tylerlead vocals, keyboards, harmonica, percussion, piano on "Push Comes to Shove", producer
 Jimmy Crespolead and rhythm guitar, backing vocals, additional vocals on "Bitch's Brew"
 Tom Hamiltonbass guitar
 Joey Kramerdrums
 Rick Dufayrhythm guitar (credited as a band member but does not play)
Additional musicians
 Brad Whitfordrhythm guitar on "Lightning Strikes"
 Paul Harrispiano on "Push Comes to Shove"
 John Turisaxophone on "Rock in a Hard Place (Cheshire Cat)"
 Reinhard Straubviolin on "Joanie's Butterfly"
 John Lievanoacoustic guitar on "Joanie's Butterfly"
 Jack Douglaspercussion, producer, additional engineer

Production 
 Godfrey Diamond – chief engineer
 Tony Bongiovi – co-producer, additional engineer
 John Agnello, Bruce Hensal, Jim Sessody, Gary Rindfuss, Josh Abbey, Malcolm Pollack, Zoe Yanakis – assistant engineers
 George Marino – mastering at Sterling Sound, New York
 Gerard Rozhek – photography, visual direction
 David Krebs, Steve Leber – management

Charts

Certification

References

Bibliography

External links 
 

Aerosmith albums
1982 albums
Hard rock albums by American artists
Albums produced by Jack Douglas (record producer)
Columbia Records albums
Albums produced by Tony Bongiovi